On April 6, 2019, nine-year-old Kyle Alwood allegedly killed five family members after starting a fire in a mobile home in Goodfield, Illinois. The nine-year-old boy was charged with the deaths on October 8.

Incident
At around 11:00 pm, a fire was reported in the central area of Peoria near the village of Goodfield, Illinois. Firefighters came a few minutes after the call. Five bodies; three children, all under three years old, Kathryn Murray, aged 69, and Jason Wall, aged 34, were all found dead from smoke inhalation. Katrina Alwood, aged 27, and her son Kyle both survived the fire.

Charges
Nine-year-old Kyle Alwood was taken into custody and charged with murder six months after the incident. The child was charged with five counts of first-degree murder, two counts of arson, and one count of aggravated arson. Due to his young age, Alwood could face five years of probation if convicted.

References

April 2019 crimes in the United States
April 2019 events in the United States
Familicides
October 2019 events in the United States